Andrew Silke holds a chair in Terrorism, Risk and Resilience at Cranfield University's Forensic Institute. Previously, he was the Head of Criminology and the Programme Director for Terrorism Studies at the University of East London.

Works

References

Academics of the University of East London
Academics of Cranfield University
Terrorism studies
Year of birth missing (living people)
Living people